</noinclude>Ed  or Edward Hardy may refer to:

Edward Hardy (politician) (1884–1960), British Labour politician
Edward Gathorne-Hardy (1901–1978), British socialite
Chips Hardy (Edward John Hardy, born 1950), English screenwriter, novelist, playwright, and creative director
Tom Hardy (Edward Thomas Hardy, born 1977), English stage, film and television actor
Edward W. Hardy (born 1992), American composer, music director, violinist, and violist

See also
Don Ed Hardy (born 1945), American tattoo artist
Hardy (disambiguation)